Rodney Craig (born 30 April 1945) is a retired British fencing international. He competed at the 1968 and 1972 Summer Olympics.

He also represented England and won a gold medal in the team sabre and a silver medal in the individual sabre, at the 1970 British Commonwealth Games in Edinburgh, Scotland.

References

1945 births
Living people
British male fencers
Olympic fencers of Great Britain
Fencers at the 1968 Summer Olympics
Fencers at the 1972 Summer Olympics
Sportspeople from Slough
Commonwealth Games medallists in fencing
Commonwealth Games gold medallists for England
Commonwealth Games silver medallists for England
Fencers at the 1970 British Commonwealth Games
Medallists at the 1970 British Commonwealth Games